Valeriya Mykhaylivna Strakhova (born 9 June 1995) is a Ukrainian tennis player.

Career
On 1 February 2016, she achieved a career-high singles ranking of world No. 231. On 11 July 2022, she peaked at No. 118 in the WTA doubles rankings. Strakhova has won 12 singles and 35 doubles titles on the ITF Women's Circuit.

She made her WTA Tour main-draw debut at the 2015 Bucharest Open in the doubles event, partnering Anastasiya Vasylyeva.

ITF Circuit finals

Singles: 17 (12 titles, 5 runner–ups)

Doubles: 53 (35 titles, 18 runner–ups)

Notes

References

External links
 
 

Ukrainian female tennis players
1995 births
Living people
People from Kerch
21st-century Ukrainian women